Domination (alternative title: Massive Assault: Phantom Renaissance) is a science fiction turn-based tactics game and is the third incarnation of Massive Assault with the subtitle “Massive Assault Like Never Before”. During the Galactic Revolution, you can side with either the Free Nations Union or the Phantom League to decide the outcome of the conflict.

External links
 

2005 video games
Computer wargames
Science fiction video games
Turn-based tactics video games
Video games set on fictional planets
Windows games
MacOS games
Wargaming.net games
DreamCatcher Interactive games
Video games developed in Belarus